A Spoonful of Paolo is an online talk show that first aired in 2011. The show was awarded the 2012 Webby Award for Online Film & Video: Variety.

Background
The show first aired in September 2011 with the first guest interview Sharon Osbourne. The following episodes featured guests Sheri Salata and Florence Henderson. His guests in the following years have been musicians, actors, and other entertainment figures, including other talk show hosts.

The host of the show is Paolo Presta, who first came to public light from an episode of the Oprah Winfrey show. Prior to hosting A Spoonful of Paolo, Presta worked backstage at The Ellen DeGeneres Show and The Talk. Presta co-originated the show with his husband and executive producer Patrick Thomassie.

Awards and nominations
 
In 2012 the series was awarded the Webby Award for Online Film & Video: Variety. It was also the subject of an episode of Oprah: Where Are They Now?.

References

2011 web series debuts
American non-fiction web series
Webby Award winners